Garik Papoyan  (born 20 September 1984) is an Armenian actor, musician, presenter, writer and comedian.

Early life 
Garik Papoyan was born on 20 September 1984 in Gyumri. He received secondary education No. 196 secondary school of Yerevan. In 2001, he entered the Faculty of Tourism and Advertisement of Russian-Armenian University, which he graduated in 2008. From 2003 to 2005 he served in the Armenian Army.

Career
He first came to prominence as a member of 32 Atam club from 2006–2010, and later appeared on its spin-off titled Vitamin Club. In 2014, he wrote "Not Alone" for Aram Mp3, which represented Armenia in the Eurovision Song Contest 2014 in Denmark and finished fourth in the final. In 2016, he formed the duo Garik & Sona with singer Sona Rubenyan, releasing several singles including "Lusin", "Esor Urbat e", "Nino" and more. Papoyan is the creator of the "Rock Generation" movement in Armenia.

Personal life
In August 2012, he married Marianne from the "X Factor" project, Mars On. The pair now has 3 daughters.

Filmography

Songwriting

Awards and nominations

References

External links 

1984 births
Living people
People from Gyumri
Armenian male film actors
Armenian male television actors
21st-century Armenian male actors